is a brand name used primarily by the Japanese multinational imaging and electronics company Ricoh for DSLR cameras, lenses, sport optics (including binoculars and rifle scopes), and CCTV optics. The Pentax brand is also used by Hoya Corporation for medical products & services, TI Asahi for surveying instruments, and Seiko Optical Products for certain optical lenses.

Corporate history

Early history 
The company was founded as Asahi Kogaku Goshi Kaisha in November 1919 by Kumao Kajiwara, at a shop in the Toshima suburb of Tokyo, and began producing spectacle lenses (which it still manufactures). In the lead-up to World War II, Asahi Optical devoted much of its time to fulfilling military contracts for optical instruments. At the end of the war, Asahi Optical was disbanded by the occupying powers, being allowed to re-form in 1948. The company resumed its pre-war activities, manufacturing binoculars and consumer camera lenses for Konishiroku and Chiyoda Kōgaku Seikō (later Konica and Minolta respectively).

Early 1950s to 2007
The period around 1950 marked the return of the Japanese photographic industry to the vigorous level of the late 1930s, and its emergence as a major exporter. The newly reborn industry had sold many of its cameras to the occupation forces (having had far more disposable income than the Japanese), which were well received. The Korean War saw a huge influx of journalists and photographers to the Far East, where they were impressed by lenses from companies such as Nikon and Canon for their Leica rangefinder cameras, and also by bodies by these and other companies to supplement and replace the Leica and Contax cameras they were using.

In 1952 Asahi Optical introduced its first camera, the Asahiflex (the first Japanese SLR using 35mm film). The name "Pentax" was originally a registered trademark of the East German VEB Zeiss Ikon (from "Pentaprism" and "Contax") and acquired by the Asahi Optical company in 1957. Since then the company has been primarily known for its photographic products, distributed 35mm equipment under the name "Asahi Pentax" and medium format 120 6x7cm equipment under the sub brand "Pentax 6x7" (from 1969 to 1990) and "Pentax 67" (from 1990 to 1999). Equipment was exported to the United States from the 1950s until the mid-1970s by Honeywell Corporation and branded as "Heiland Pentax" and later "Honeywell Pentax". The company was renamed Pentax Corporation in 2002. It was one of the world's largest optical companies, producing still cameras, binoculars, spectacle lenses, and a variety of other optical instruments. In 2004, Pentax had about 6000 employees.

Merger with Hoya
In December 2006, Pentax started the process of merging with Hoya Corporation to form 'Hoya Pentax HD Corporation'. Hoya's primary goal was to strengthen its medical-related business by taking advantage of Pentax's technologies and expertise in the field of endoscopes, intraocular lenses, surgical loupes, biocompatible ceramics, etc. It was speculated that Pentax's camera business could be sold off after the merger. A stock swap was to be completed by October 1, 2007, but the process was called off on April 11, 2007. Pentax president Fumio Urano resigned over the matter, with Takashi Watanuki taking over as president of Pentax. However, despite Watanuki's previously stated opposition to a Hoya merger, on May 16 it was reported that Pentax had accepted "with conditions" a sweetened offer from Hoya, according to a source familiar with the matter. Pentax was under increasing pressure from its major shareholders, Sparx Asset Management in particular, to accept Hoya's bid.

On August 6, 2007, Hoya completed a friendly public tender offer for Pentax and acquired 90.59% of the company. On August 14, 2007, the company became a consolidated subsidiary of Hoya. On October 29, 2007, Hoya and Pentax announced that Pentax would merge with and into Hoya effective on March 31, 2008. Hoya closed the Pentax-owned factory in Tokyo, and moved all manufacturing facilities to Cebu, Philippines and Hanoi, Vietnam.

Ricoh Imaging Company
Japanese optical glass-maker Hoya Corporation stated on July 1, 2011, that it would sell its Pentax camera business to copier and printer maker Ricoh, in a deal the Nikkei business daily reported was worth about 10 billion yen ($124.2 million). On July 29, 2011, Hoya transferred its Pentax imaging systems business to a newly established subsidiary called Pentax Imaging Corporation. On October 1, 2011, Ricoh acquired all shares of Pentax Imaging Corp. and renamed the new subsidiary Pentax Ricoh Imaging Company, Ltd. Hoya will continue to use the Pentax brand name for their medical related products such as endoscopes. On August 1, 2013, the company name was changed to Ricoh Imaging Company  Ltd.

Products

The corporation is best known for its "Pentax" brand cameras, starting with the pivotal "Asahi Pentax" single-lens reflex camera of 1957. Asahi's first series of cameras, the Asahiflex of 1952, had been the first Japanese-made SLRs for 35mm film, and the Asahiflex IIB of 1954 the first Japanese SLR with an instant-return mirror. The Asahi Pentax itself was the first Japanese fixed-pentaprism SLR. In 1969 under the sub-brand "Pentax 6x7", the company started to produce medium format 120 6x7cm cameras. In 1990 the company renamed the sub-brand from "Pentax 6x7" to "Pentax 67".  The company produced Pentax 67 cameras until 1999 and ceased distribution in 2002.  The success of the "Pentax" series was such that the business eventually renamed itself "Pentax Corporation" after the 35mm product line. Although the corporation ultimately merged into Hoya Corporation, it eventually was purchased by Ricoh, which continues to develop and market digital cameras under the Pentax brand. Currently, Pentax DSLRs are manufactured in Cebu, Philippines, while digital Pentax lenses are manufactured in Hanoi, Vietnam, under Pentax Ricoh Imaging Products.

Corporate cooperation and competition
In 2005, Pentax Corporation partnered with Samsung to share work on camera technology and recapture market ground from Nikon and Canon. Pentax and Samsung subsequently released new DSLR siblings from this agreement. The Pentax *ist DS and *istDL2 also appeared as the Samsung GX-1S and GX-1L, while the jointly developed (90% Pentax and 10% Samsung) Pentax K10D and K20D gave birth to the Samsung GX-10 and GX-20 respectively. Some Pentax lenses are also rebranded and sold as  Samsung Schneider Kreuznach D-Xenon and D-Xenogon lenses for Samsung DSLRs. However, both brands are completely compatible with Pentax and Samsung DSLRs. In 2017, Samsung announced its departure of the camera market.

Hoya is focusing its main business on the following areas: information technology, eye care, life care, optics, imaging systems. Pentax’s main competitors include Canon, Nikon, Olympus, Panasonic, Sony (imaging/camera business), Fujifilm, Sangi, Kyocera (life care business).

Europe and Asia
Asahi Pentax (all 35mm equipment)
Pentax 6x7 (medium format 120 6x7cm equipment from 1969 to 1990)
Pentax 67 (medium format 120 6x7cm equipment from 1990 to 1999)

North America
Honeywell Pentax (medium format 120 6x7cm equipment from 1969 to 1990)

Subsidiaries

Asia
 Pentax Industrial Instruments Co., Ltd.
 Pentax Optotech Co., Ltd.
 Pentax Service, Co., Ltd.
 Pentax Fukushima Co., Ltd.
 Pentax Tohoku Co., Ltd.
 Pentax Trading (Shanghai) Co.,Ltd.
 Pentax (Shanghai) Corporation
 Pentax Hong Kong Ltd.
 Pentax Cebu Philippines Corporation
 Pentax VN Co., Ltd.

Europe
 Pentax Europe GmbH
 Pentax U.K. Ltd.
 Pentax France S.A.
 Pentax Schweiz AG
 Pentax Scandinavia AB
 Pentax Nederland B.V.
 Pentax Europe n.v.

North America
 Pentax of America Inc. (Pentax Medical Company)
 Pentax of America Inc. (Pentax Imaging Company)
 Pentax of America Inc.
 Pentax Medical Company
 Pentax Imaging Company
 Microline Pentax Inc.
 Pentax Canada Inc.
 KayPentax (Pentax Medical Company)
 Pentax Teknologies.

See also

 Asahi Pentax
 Asahiflex
 List of digital camera brands
 List of Pentax products
 List of photographic equipment makers
 Pentax cameras
 Pentax lenses

Notes

References
 The Japanese Historical Camera. 日本の歴史的カメラ (Nihon no rekishiteki kamera). 2nd ed. Tokyo: JCII Camera Museum, 2004.

External links

 Pentax Ricoh Imaging Company (digital cameras, binoculars, etc. – Ricoh)
 Pentax Medical Company (endoscopic imaging devices – Hoya)
 Pentax New Ceramics (hydroxyapatite – Hoya)
 Pentax Surveying Instruments (TI Asahi)
 Pentax lenses (Seiko Optical Products)

 
Fuyo Group
Companies formerly listed on the Tokyo Stock Exchange
Japanese brands
Lens manufacturers
Manufacturing companies based in Tokyo
Manufacturing companies established in 1919
Photography companies of Japan
Technology companies disestablished in 2008
2008 mergers and acquisitions
Japanese companies established in 1919